Ethel is an unincorporated community in East Feliciana Parish, Louisiana, United States. Ethel has a post office with ZIP code 70730, which opened on September 15, 1884.

Notable person
Jimmy Dotson, a blues singer, guitarist and drummer, was born in Ethel.

References

Unincorporated communities in East Feliciana Parish, Louisiana
Unincorporated communities in Louisiana